Keen is an English surname. It is either a nickname surname for someone who is brave, or from the Middle English or Olde English personal name 'Kene', which means king. Alternatively, it can be a variation of the Irish surname O'Cahan.

Notable people with this name include
 Alan Keen (1937–2011), British politician
 Andrew Keen (born c. 1960), British-American entrepreneur and author
 Ann Keen (born 1948), British politician
 Arthur Keen (businessman) (1835–1915), British entrepreneur
 Arthur Keen (aviator) (1895–1918), British World War I flying ace
 Dafne Keen (born 2005), British-Spanish actress
 Diane Keen (born 1946), English actress
 Geoffrey Keen (1916–2005), English actor
 Harold Keen (1894–1973), British engineer
 Helen Keen, English comedian
 Jessica Keen (1975–1991), American murder victim
 John "Speedy" Keen (1945–2002), English rock musician
 John Keen (cyclist) (1849–1902), British cyclist
 Laurence Keen, British Archaeologist
 Malcolm Keen (1887–1970), British actor
 Noah Keen (1920–2019), American actor
 Maurice Keen (1933–2012), British historian
 Peter Keen (born 1976), English footballer
 Peter Keen (cyclist) (born 1964), British cycling coach
 Richard Keen (born 1954), Scottish lawyer
 Richard Keen (racing driver) (born 1986), English racing driver
 Robert Earl Keen (born 1956), American guitarist
 Sam Keen, American author, professor and philosopher
 Simon Keen (born 1987), Australian cricketer
 Steve Keen (born 1953), Australian economist
 Will Keen (born 1976), English actor
 Captain Keen/Commander Keen, the main character in Commander Keen games

See also
 Keene (surname)
 Kene, another name

References

English-language surnames